The 2014 Okayama GT 300 km was the first round of the 2014 Super GT season. It took place on April 6, 2014.

Race result
Race result is as follows.

GT500 Fastest Lap – Kazuya Oshima, #6 Lexus Team LeMans ENEOS Lexus RC F – 1:21.977
GT300 Fastest Lap – Morio Nitta, #31 apr Toyota Prius – 1:28.931

References

External links
Super GT official website 

Okayama GT 300km